Clerodendrum speciosissimum is a tropical shrub of the family Lamiaceae, native to Indonesia and Papuasia, but now naturalized in parts of Latin America, Africa, the Caribbean, Seychelles, and Florida.

Description
The shrub can reach up to 4 m. The leaves are square-shaped, and the large heart-shaped flowers can reach up to 30 cm. It is cultivated as an ornamental plant, in particular for its bright red flowers.

Gallery

References

External links
 
 Clerodendrum speciosissimum  Van Geert ex C. Morren, at Tela Botanica
 Clerodendrum speciosissimum  Van Geert ex Morr., at Tela Botanica
 Clerodendrum speciosissimum  Van Geert ex Morr., at ITIS
 Clerodendrum speciosissimum C.Morren, at Aluka

speciosissimum
Flora of Malesia
Flora of Papuasia
Flora of Vanuatu
Plants described in 1836
Garden plants